Nieman is a Dutch and Low German surname that originated as a nickname for either an unknown or nameless person (Niemand in Dutch and German) or a newcomer to a place (modern Dutch nieuw man, cognate to English Newman and High German Neumann)  People with this surname include:

 Alfred Nieman (1914–1997), British pianist and composer
 Andries Nieman (1927–2009), South African boxer
 Bob Nieman (1927–1985), American baseball player and scout
 Butch Nieman (1918–1993), American baseball player
 Charles Nieman (born 1949), American megachurch preacher
 Lucius W. Nieman (1857–1935), American journalist
 Randall Nieman, American musician
 Robert Nieman (born 1947), American modern pentathlete
 Sebilla Alida Johanna Niemans (1927–1959), Dutch murder victim known as Blonde Dolly

See also

Neeman (disambiguation)
Neman (disambiguation)
Neiman
Niemen (disambiguation)
Niemann
Niemand
Nijman

References

Dutch-language surnames